Gnorimoschema minor is a moth in the family Gelechiidae. It was described by August Busck in 1906. It is found in North America, where it has been recorded from Texas.

The wingspan is about 7 mm. The forewings are light ochreous, evenly overlaid with dark brown scales and with thin indistinct ochreous longitudinal streaks. The hindwings are dark fuscous.

References

Gnorimoschema
Moths described in 1906